John Austin Thomas Hanlon (18 December 1905 – 17 October 1983) was an English athlete who competed for Great Britain in the 1928 Summer Olympics.

He was born in Portsmouth and died in Morpeth, Northumberland.

In 1928 he was eliminated in the first round of the Olympic 400 metre event.

At the 1930 Empire Games he won the silver medal with the English relay team in the 4×110 yards competition. In the 220 yards contest and in the 440 yards event he was eliminated in the heats.

External links
sports-reference.com

1905 births
1983 deaths
English male sprinters
Olympic athletes of Great Britain
Athletes (track and field) at the 1928 Summer Olympics
Athletes (track and field) at the 1930 British Empire Games
Commonwealth Games silver medallists for England
People from Morpeth, Northumberland
Sportspeople from Northumberland
Sportspeople from Portsmouth
Commonwealth Games medallists in athletics
20th-century English people
Medallists at the 1930 British Empire Games